Yuxarı Aralıq (also, Yukhary Aralyg and Yukhari Aralik) is a village and municipality in the Sharur District of Nakhchivan Autonomous Republic, Azerbaijan. It is located 420 km in the south-east from the district center, on the right bank of the Arpachay River. Its population is busy with gardening, vegetable-growing and animal husbandry. There are secondary school, music school, cultural house, kindergarten, mosque and a medical center in the village. It has a population of 1,074.

Etymology
The previous name of the Yuxarı Aralıq (Upper Aralyg) village was Aralıq Başkənd (Aralyg Bashkend). The second component of the name was served to distinguish the village from the same named settlement. Aralıq means "middle, the center ". In the Turkic languages, the word of başkənd (bashkend) also are using in meaning as "center", "main city", "capital". The name of the village means "the Aralıq village which is located in the upper side".

References 

Populated places in Sharur District